The Dark Angel (original title Johannes Angelos) is a novel by Finnish author Mika Waltari about a hopeless love affair and the Fall of Constantinople. The Finnish version was originally published in 1952, with an English edition being published in Great Britain in 1953.

Plot
The narrator is Jean Ange, alias John Angelos, born in Avignon. Prior to the events of the novel, he had been a friend of Sultan Murad II and then also of his son, Mehmed II; but once Mehmed had begun his march to Constantinople, Ange fled there.

The novel begins as Jean Ange meets Anna Notaras in Constantinople and they fall instantly in love. At first Ange is unaware of her identity, but later he realises she is the daughter of megas doux Lucas Notaras.

Ange is committed to fight to the death on the side of the Christians against the Islamic Ottoman forces. Nevertheless, his prior relationship with Mehmed earns him constant distrust from both Latin and Greek Christians.

Eventually Jean Ange is revealed as a rightful heir of Byzantine emperors, although he has no interest in power. Constantinople ultimately falls under Mehmed's attack, Anna dies while in the disguise of a soldier, and Jean is tortured to death by Mehmed.

Research and writing
The novel, written in a diary format, was inspired by a real diary by Niccolò Barbaro describing the 1453 siege of Constantinople. The character of Angelos especially had his basis on a marginal note in red ink mentioning a Greek traitor for the Turks by the name of Angelo Zacaria. Scholar Panu Rajala visited Biblioteca Nazionale Marciana, which held both a copy and the original, and read from the checkout list that Mika Waltari was the fourth one to be allowed to examine the book, on 7 November 1952.

Waltari abandoned an early draft, closer to his previous novels in structure, which was published posthumously in 1981 as Nuori Johannes.

Reception
Time praised Waltari as an "anything but clumsy" novelist with his portraiture of the battle environment, and likened the fractures forming in Constantinople's walls to the growing division between Christians, leading to irreparable ruination. Daily News foresaw it for many readers as "the most powerful and skillful of the historical novels of Mika Waltari". The New York Times, while regarding The Dark Angel as falling short of Waltari's previous historical fiction and reliant on its subject matter for gaining readership, nevertheless commended the handling of all minor characters and "Mr. Waltari's understanding of the interplay of motives that permit Mohammed II, complete with satellites, to overthrow the ancient capital".

References

Citations

Bibliography

External links
 Online excerpt
 Review in "The Diary Review"
 Mika Waltari and Constantinople from the Authors' Calendar website
 Review at Historical Novels Info website

Novels by Mika Waltari
1952 Finnish novels
Novels set in Istanbul
Fiction set in 1453
Novels set in the 15th century
Fall of Constantinople
Novels set in the Byzantine Empire
20th-century Finnish novels
Fictional diaries